Maurice Censer (also Marcel Censer; 20 September 1889 – 10 December 1956) was a Belgian chess player.

Biography
Maurice Censer was one of Belgium's leading chess players from to the late 1910s to the late 1920s. In 1918, in Scheveningen he shared 3rd - 4th place in International Chess Tournament. In 1927, in Ghent Maurice Censer won 3rd place in Belgian Chess Championship.

Maurice Censer played for Belgium in the Chess Olympiad:
 In 1927, at fourth board in the 1st Chess Olympiad in London (+2, =4, -9).

References

External links

1889 births
1956 deaths
Belgian chess players
Chess Olympiad competitors